The BAFTA Student Film Awards are an annual awards ceremony hosted by BAFTA as a showcase for rising industry talent. The animation award was sponsored in 2017 and 2018 by animation studio Laika.

Awards
Awards & Prizes
 Student Film Award for Animation
 Student Film Award for Live Action 
 Student Film Award for Documentary

References

External links
 Official site Retrieved 12 March 2019

Film festivals in Los Angeles
Student
Awards established in 2017